C. L. Williams was an American football coach.  He was the third head football coach at Kansas Wesleyan University in Salina, Kansas, serving for two seasons, from 1908 to 1909, compiling a record of 9–5.

References

Year of birth missing
Year of death missing
Kansas Wesleyan Coyotes football coaches